Pavel Svoboda (born in 1987 in Opočno, Czech Republic) is a Czech organist.

This organist and harpsichordist graduated from the Conservatory of Pardubice (prof. Josef Rafaja and Doc. Vaclav Rabas). Since 2008, he has been studying at the Music Faculty of the Academy of Performing Arts in Prague at Doc. Jaroslav Tuma and since 2010 at the University of the Arts in Berlin at Leo van Doeselaar. He performs at music festivals, cooperates with violinist Iva Kramperová and as a soloist he plays with the orchestras (Karlovy Vary Symphony Orchestra etc.). Since 2004 he has been a standing organist and cembalist of Barocco sempre giovane chamber orchestra (artistic director Josef Krečmer). He makes CD recordings, as well as those for Český rozhlas and the Czech Television. He is also active as a dramaturge and organizer of the classical music festivals in Bohemia, in 2011 he became artistic director of The International Music Festival of F. L. Vek.

Prizes 
 Competition for Young Organists in Opava 2004 - 1st prize
 Prize of the foundation Czech Music Fund (Český hudební fond) 
 International Performers Competition in Brno 2007 - 1st prize and the Laureate title 
 Prize of the mayor of the city of Pardubice for excellent study results
 Petr Eben International Organ Competition 2008 -  2nd prize

External links 
 Home page of Pavel Svoboda
 International Performers' Competition Brno
 Bach, Sluka, Widor, YouTube.com 
 New Year's Concert in Dobruska

Czech classical organists
Male classical organists
Czech harpsichordists
Academy of Performing Arts in Prague alumni
People from Opočno
1987 births
Living people
21st-century organists
21st-century Czech male musicians